Keila da Silva Costa (born 6 February 1983) is a Brazilian long jumper and triple jumper. She has competed in three Olympic Games, 2004, 2008 and 2012, and has reached the final round both there and in World Championships and World Indoor Championships. She is the South American record holder in triple jump with 14.58 metres, and has 6.88 metres in the long jump. Both results were achieved in 2007.

Early career
She was born in Abreu e Lima near Recife, and took up athletics at the age of nine. It was not the easiest of things to become an international athlete, as the city of Abreu e Lima did not sport a rubber track; also she came from a "humble family".

As a junior athlete she competed in two World Junior Championships. At the 2000 edition in Santiago, Chile she finished eleventh in the triple jump. Her personal best at the time was 13.23 metres. In 2001, she broke the 14-metre barrier as she improved to 14.00 metres at a meet in São Caetano do Sul. This was a new South American junior record. In 2002 the World Junior Championships were held in Kingston, Jamaica. Here she finished ninth in the long jump and won the bronze medal in the triple jump. She was the first Brazilian to win a medal at the World Junior Championships. She had not improved in the latter event, but her personal best in the long jump was 6.46 metres, achieved in September 2002 in Rio de Janeiro.

In the following seasons, she rarely competed internationally, except for a participation at the 2004 Olympic Games where she failed to reach the final. She was injured for most of 2003. By June 2005 she had improved to 6.63 metres in the long jump, and in February 2006 she improved to 14.17 metres in the triple jump. In March 2006 she competed in triple jump at the World Indoor Championships and her first international triple jump event since the 2002 World Juniors—but even though she approached her maximum level with a jump of 14.11 metres, she again failed to reach the final. In late 2006, she represented the Americas (except for the United States) in long jump at the World Cup event, finishing sixth.

Maurren Higa Maggi later captured the South American triple jump record, and also dominated in national championships. Costa won her first Brazilian title in 2003. On the regional level, Costa won five medals at the South American Championships in 2001, 2003 and 2005.

International breakthrough
Her definite international breakthrough came in 2007. She improved both her personal best jumps with good margins. In May in Belém she jumped 6.88 metres, and in São Paulo in June she jumped 14.57 metres for a continental and championship record at the 2007 South American Championships in Athletics. She also won the silver medal in the long jump behind Maggi. In May she had become the first South American woman to break the 15-metre-barrier. However, her 15.10 m jump in Uberlândia, Brazil had a tail wind of 2.7 m/second, and thus could not be accepted. When jumping 14.57, she established a new South American record. At the 2007 Pan American Games she won two silver medals, and at the 2007 World Championships in August she finished ninth in the triple and seventh in the long jump competition. At the World Athletics Final towards the end of the season, she finished sixth in the triple and fifth in the long jump.

In 2008, she did not compete in the triple jump at all. In the long jump, though, she finished seventh at the World Indoor Championships and eleventh at the Olympic Games. Her season's best was 6.79 metres, achieved in June in São Paulo. Her South American record still stands.

In the 2009 season, she won the Troféu Brasil Caixa de Atletismo with a season's best of 6.79 m, putting an end to rival Maurren Maggi's decade-long dominance of the championships. She became the continental long jump champion for a second time at the 2009 South American Championships in Athletics. The long jump at the 2009 Lusophony Games was a head-to-head with Portugal's Naide Gomes and Costa took the silver medal, three centimetres back with a mark of 6.71 m. Her focus turned to the 2009 World Championships in Athletics, but she failed to record a mark in her three attempts in the long jump final. She closed the season with a seventh-place finish at the 2009 IAAF World Athletics Final.

She opened 2010 with her first podium finish on the global stage: competing in the long jump at the 2010 IAAF World Indoor Championships, she twice jumped 6.63 m to secure the bronze medal behind Brittney Reese and Gomes. She became a double Brazilian champion later that year with victories in both the long jump and triple jump at the Troféu Brasil Caixa de Atletismo.

Personal life
Costa has a relationship with Panamanian Olympic champion in the long jump, Irving Saladino. The two met at the 2004 Olympic Games.

Notes
 Note that this is sometimes given, wrongly, as being a South American record. The best South American result at the time belonged to Luciana dos Santos, who jumped 14.01 metres in 2000.

Personal bests

Achievements

References

External links 
 

1983 births
Living people
Brazilian female long jumpers
Brazilian female triple jumpers
Olympic athletes of Brazil
Athletes (track and field) at the 2004 Summer Olympics
Athletes (track and field) at the 2008 Summer Olympics
Athletes (track and field) at the 2012 Summer Olympics
Athletes (track and field) at the 2016 Summer Olympics
Pan American Games athletes for Brazil
Pan American Games silver medalists for Brazil
Pan American Games medalists in athletics (track and field)
Athletes (track and field) at the 2007 Pan American Games
Athletes (track and field) at the 2011 Pan American Games
Athletes (track and field) at the 2015 Pan American Games
World Athletics Championships athletes for Brazil
South American Games gold medalists for Brazil
South American Games medalists in athletics
Competitors at the 2002 South American Games
Competitors at the 2014 South American Games
Medalists at the 2007 Pan American Games
Medalists at the 2015 Pan American Games
Sportspeople from Pernambuco
South American Championships in Athletics winners
21st-century Brazilian women
20th-century Brazilian women